Fellowship of the Royal College of Emergency Medicine (FRCEM) is a postgraduate award made by the Royal College of Emergency Medicine to specialists in Emergency Medicine.

It is a required part of specialist training for those undertaking GMC approved training in the UK, but is also taken by doctors from a variety of other countries. In particular, several parts of the examination are held in overseas examination centres in Dublin, Chennai, Hyderabad, New Delhi, Reykjavik, Kuala Lumpur and Muscat.

Since August 2016, FRCEM has been divided into three constituent parts: Primary, Intermediate and Final.

Description
Primary FRCEM

 Any person registered with the GMC or IMC is eligible to apply for this examination
 Consists of one written paper lasting 3 hours and consisting of 180 single-best answer questions
 Covers the RCEM Basic Sciences Curriculum

Intermediate FRCEM

 Short Answer Question paper - 3 hours and 60 questions.
 Situational Judgement paper - 2 hours and 120 single best answer questions

Final FRCEM

 Can be taken by those who have completed 24 months of the 36 month higher specialist training programme in EM.

 Critical Appraisal
 Quality Improvement Project
 Clinical Short Answer Question paper - 3 hours and 60 questions
 OSCE - 16x 8 minute stations

Membership of the Royal College of Emergency Medicine 
Following development and implementation of the 2021 curriculum, the college has reverted to its pre-August 2016 requirement following GMC approval where doctors completing their core training in EM are required to complete examinations leading to the award of Membership of the Royal College of Emergency Medicine (MRCEM). This is however, not compulsory for trainees who have completed the FRCEM primary, intermediate SAQ and SJP.

See also
Royal College of Emergency Medicine
Fellow of the American College of Emergency Physicians
Fellow of the Australasian College of Emergency Medicine

References

Emergency medicine education
Medical education in the United Kingdom
Professional titles and certifications